Moya may refer to:

People 
 Moya (given name)
 Moya (surname)

Places 
 Moya, Comoros, a town
 Moya, Nigeria, a Local Government Area in Niger State
 Moya District, Peru
 Moya, Cuenca, a municipality in Castilla–La Mancha, Spain
 Moya, Las Palmas, a municipality in the Canary Islands Spain
 Moià (Spanish: Moyá), a municipality in Catalonia, Spain

Other uses 
 Moya (architecture), the core of a building in Japanese architecture
 Museum of Young Art (MOYA), Vienna, Austria, a museum devoted to 21st century art
 Moya (Farscape), a living space ship from the TV series Farscape
 "Moya", the first track of the EP Slow Riot for New Zerø Kanada by Godspeed You! Black Emperor

See also 
 Moyamoya disease
 Moja (disambiguation)